New Dragon Gate Inn is a Chinese historical and wuxia television series adapted from the Hong Kong wuxia film of the same name. It is directed by Zhu Shaojie and starring Ma Ke, Stephy Qi, Shen Mengchen, Bao Jianfeng, Chen Xiaodong, and Liu Yaoyuan.

Cast
 Ma Ke as Zhou Huai'an, head of the imperial guard troop.
 Stephy Qi as Jin Xiangyu， landlady.
 Shen Mengchen as Qiu Moyan.
 Bao Jianfeng as Cao Shaoqin， leader of the Eastern Depot.
 Chen Xiaodong as His Royal Highness
 Liu Yaoyuan as Ying Guanzhen,  son of His Royal Highness
 Ye Ziqi as Hojo, a Japanese ninja.
 Yu Bo as Wang Chao, a wealthy merchant
 Du Junze as Xiao Fangfei
 Zhang Huizhong as Jia Ting
 Luo Huiyu as Yang Yao
 Ma He as You Dianzi
 Xiao Can as Sai Hua

Production
Principal photography started in January 2017 in Hengdian World Studios and wrapped in June 2017.

References

Television series set in the Ming dynasty
Chinese wuxia television series
2019 Chinese television series debuts
2019 Chinese television series endings
Television series set in the 15th century